Kanan may refer to:
 Kanan-e Olya
 Kanan-e Sofla